Evan Waldrep (born May 8, 1997) is an American professional soccer player who plays as a midfielder for AC Syracuse Pulse in the National Independent Soccer Association.

Career

College
Waldrep played at Creighton University in his freshmen and sophomore years and then transferred to Grand Canyon University for the 2017 season. He was named one of the top three Division I "impact transfers" by Top Drawer Soccer.

Professional
Waldrep was signed by Phoenix Rising FC on February 14, 2018. He also played for FC Tucson of the Premier Development League in 2016.

On August 12, 2019, California United Strikers FC announced they had signed Waldrep ahead of their inaugural season in the National Independent Soccer Association. He played in each of the team's regular season games during the fall and started in the West Coast Championship against Los Angeles Force which his team won via penalty kicks.

References

External links
 Grand Canyon University Bio
 Creighton University Bio
 NISA profile

American soccer players
Phoenix Rising FC players
1997 births
AC Syracuse Pulse players
California United Strikers FC players
FC Tucson players
USL Championship players
Living people
Association football midfielders
Grand Canyon Antelopes men's soccer players
Creighton Bluejays men's soccer players
USL League Two players
National Independent Soccer Association players
Soccer players from Phoenix, Arizona
United States men's youth international soccer players